Elections to Kilmarnock and Loudoun District Council were held on 7 May 1992, on the same day as the other Scottish local government elections. This was the final election to the district council which was abolished in 1995 along with Cumnock and Doon Valley District Council and was replaced by East Ayrshire Council following the implementation of the Local Government etc. (Scotland) Act 1994. The regional council, Strathclyde was also abolished and the new unitary authority took on its responsibilities.

The election was also the last to use the 18 wards created by the Initial Statutory Reviews of Electoral Arrangements in 1981 without alterations. Each ward elected one councillor using first-past-the-post voting.

Despite coming second in the popular vote, Labour remained the largest party on the district council after winning eight seats, however, they no longer had an overall majority after losing four seats. The Scottish National Party (SNP) won the popular vote and gained four seats but that wasn't enough to overtake Labour. As a result, they became the second-largest party on the council with seven seats. The Conservatives' vote share fell by 6.2% but they remained on three seats.

Results

Source:

Ward results

Ward 1

Ward 2

Ward 3

Ward 4

Ward 5

Ward 6

Ward 7

Ward 8

Ward 9

Ward 10

Ward 11

Ward 12

Ward 13

Ward 14

Ward 15

Ward 16

Ward 17

Ward 18

References

Kilmarnock and Loudoun District Council elections
Kilmarnock